Mirosław Bąk (born 23 November 1961) is a retired Polish football striker.

References

1961 births
Living people
Polish footballers
Ruch Chorzów players
Athinaikos F.C. players
Szombierki Bytom players
Association football forwards
Polish expatriate footballers
Expatriate footballers in Greece
Polish expatriate sportspeople in Greece
Poland international footballers
Sportspeople from Bytom